Matteo Lodo (born 25 October 1994) is an Italian rower. He won the bronze medal in the coxless four at the 2016 Summer Olympics and at the 2020 Summer Olympics, and the gold medal at the 2015 World Rowing Championships and at the 2017 World Rowing Championships, in the coxless four and in the coxless pair respectively.

References

External links
 

Italian male rowers
1994 births
Living people
People from Terracina
World Rowing Championships medalists for Italy
Olympic rowers of Italy
Rowers at the 2016 Summer Olympics
Medalists at the 2016 Summer Olympics
Olympic medalists in rowing
Olympic bronze medalists for Italy
Rowers of Fiamme Gialle
Rowers at the 2020 Summer Olympics
Medalists at the 2020 Summer Olympics
Sportspeople from the Province of Latina
21st-century Italian people